Too Hood 2 Be Hollywood is the tenth studio album by rapper B.G. The album was released on December 8, 2009 after numerous push backs. The single "Ya Heard Me" marked the first time Lil Wayne and Juvenile had collaborated on a track in eight years.

Background
B.G. explained his personal development along with boasting his ability "to make a classic album", in which he stated the following, 

B.G. also blames 50 Cent for missing Young Buck collabo. In addition to speaking on Buck's verse being taken off "Nigga Owe Me Some Money," B.G. also responded to hearing his name mentioned in Fif's "So Disrespectful" track.

Track listing

Chart positions

References

2009 albums
B.G. (rapper) albums
Albums produced by Cool & Dre
Albums produced by Mannie Fresh
Albums produced by Scott Storch
Albums produced by J.U.S.T.I.C.E. League